Snooker world rankings 1993/1994: The professional world rankings for the top 64 snooker players in the 1993–94 season are listed below.

References

1993
Rankings 1994
Rankings 1993